Ninian Lindsay' (1753 – February 25, 1828) was an Irish-born political figure in New Brunswick. He represented Charlotte in the Legislative Assembly of New Brunswick from 1802 to 1809.

Lindsay came to New Brunswick around 1786, settling at St. Stephen in Charlotte County. He married Hannah Marks.

References 
 

1753 births
1828 deaths
Members of the Legislative Assembly of New Brunswick
Colony of New Brunswick people
Irish emigrants to pre-Confederation New Brunswick